Blast Tyrant is the sixth full-length studio album by American rock band Clutch and was released March 23, 2004, but has since had a reissue on May 10, 2011. It was the first release with DRT Entertainment by the band.

Album information 
The unabridged title of the album is Blast Tyrant Atlas of the Invisible World with Illustrations of Strange Beasts and Phantoms.

A reissue of the album was released through Clutch's own label, Weathermaker Music, and contains the original album along with a second bonus disc, entitled Basket of Eggs, which is a collection of acoustic versions of songs, from 2001 to 2011 by the band, including the "Polar Bear Lair Demos". The music video for the song "The Mob Goes Wild" was created by Ryan Dunn. Unlike some reissues the band have done, or some of the "import" versions of their albums to begin with, the track listing of the original album remains the same.

The album debuted at #147 on the Billboard 200, selling 8,000 copies in its first week.

Track listing 
All songs written by Clutch.

Original album

Basket of Eggs (2011 bonus disc)
Tracks 1–4 were recorded between September 2010 and January 2011; track 5 was live in a Milwaukee radio station in 2001; tracks 6-10 were recorded in July 2002 and are known as the "Polar Bear Lair Demos", of which 6, 7 and 10 are previously unreleased tracks by the band.

Personnel 
 Neil Fallon – vocals, rhythm guitar, organ
 Tim Sult – lead guitar
 Dan Maines – bass
 Jean-Paul Gaster – drums

Production 
 Produced by Clutch and Machine
 Recorded and mixed by Machine
 Drums were recorded at Water Music, Hoboken, New Jersey
 Pro-Tools by Nick Rowe and assisted by Ted Young
 Guitars and vocals were recorded at The Machine Shop, Hoboken, New Jersey
 Additional production of vocals and guitars recorded in Jean-Paul Gaster's living room
 Mixed at the Machine Shop, Hoboken, New Jersey
 Mastered by Ue Nastasi at Sterling Sound
 Artwork by Encarnacion Hernandez

Chart performance 
Album - Billboard (United States)

Singles - Billboard (United States)

References 

2004 albums
Clutch (band) albums
DRT Entertainment albums
Albums produced by Machine (producer)